Johannes Siir (11 May 1889 – 18 January 1941) was an Estonian military colonel and sport shooter.

He was born in Kolga Rural Municipality, Harju County. He participated in World War I and the Estonian War of Independence. In 1933 he graduated from Tondi military school.

He won bronze medal at 1931 ISSF World Shooting Championships; being the first Estonian sport shooter to get a medal at world shooting championships. 1931 he was a member of Estonian national sport shooting team. 1932–1939 he was the manager of Estonian team.

References

1889 births
1941 deaths
Estonian male sport shooters
Estonian military personnel of World War I
Estonian military personnel of the Estonian War of Independence
Recipients of the Military Order of the Cross of the Eagle, Class III
20th-century Estonian military personnel
People from Kuusalu Parish